was the eleventh single by the Japanese band The Blue Hearts and reached #24 on the Oricon charts in 1991.

Details
"Ano Ko ni Touch" was released as part of The Blue Hearts' fifth album, High Kicks, which was released shortly after the single on December 21. The promotional video for the song was filmed in Los Angeles.

The B-side track, "Waa Waa" (わーわー), was a live version of the recording. It was written by the band's guitarist Masatoshi Mashima. It is unknown if this song was ever actually recorded in a studio, as only live versions of it have been included on albums.

References

1991 singles
The Blue Hearts songs
Songs written by Hiroto Kōmoto
1991 songs